Linda Pétursdóttir (born 27 December 1969 in Húsavík) is an Icelandic business woman and beauty queen who won Miss World 1988.

Linda was born in Húsavík and raised there and in Vopnafjörður. She won Miss Iceland on 23 May 1988 and Miss World that November.

She operated a spa company named Baðhúsið for over 20 years, which closed in 2014. In 2003, with Reynir Traustason, she published her autobiography, Linda - ljós & skuggar.

In 2015, she was guest judge in the final Miss World 2015 beauty pageant in Sanya, Hainan, China PR.

In 2019, Pétursdóttir became the license holder for Miss World Iceland.

References

External links 
Official website

Linda Petursdottir
Linda Petursdottir
Miss World winners
Miss World 1988 delegates
1969 births
Living people
Place of birth missing (living people)
Linda Petursdottir
Linda Petursdottir